Damirchi-ye Kharabahsi (also Romanized as Damīrchī-ye Kharābahsī; also known as Damīrchī-ye Kharābasī and Damīrch-ye Kharābahsī) is a village in Qeshlaq-e Jonubi Rural District, Qeshlaq Dasht District, Bileh Savar County, Ardabil Province, Iran. At the 2006 census, its population was 323, in 75 families.

References 

Towns and villages in Bileh Savar County